Natron is a mineral containing sodium compounds.

Natron may also refer to:
 Natron (software), a video compositing application
 Lake Natron, a salt lake in Tanzania

See also 

 Natrona (disambiguation)